Scolioplecta molybdantha is a species of moth of the family Tortricidae. It is found in Western Australia, Australia.

References

Moths described in 1910
Phricanthini
Moths of Australia
Arthropods of Western Australia